Workmania is a genus of spiders in the family Zodariidae. It was first described in 2012 by Dankittipakul, Jocqué & Singtripop. , it contains 2 Asian species.

References

Zodariidae
Araneomorphae genera
Spiders of Asia